The 1890 Baker Methodists football team represented Baker University in the 1890 college football season. They finished with a record of 1–1 in their inaugural season.

Schedule

See also
 Timeline of college football in Kansas
 List of the first college football game in each US state

References

Baker
Baker Wildcats football seasons
Baker Methodists football